Rory Hughes (born 4 March 1993) is a Scottish rugby union player who recently played for Glasgow Warriors at the Wing or Full-back positions.

Rugby union career

Amateur career
Hughes was born in Glasgow and was raised in the Castlemilk district; he attended a school with no rugby programme. From the age of 6 he played for GHA, before joining Stirling County and the Scottish Rugby Elite Development system in 2011, aged 18. He was assigned to Glasgow Warriors, joining the professional squad in 2013. He has since spent time back with Stirling County when released to play for them by the Warriors.

Hughes was assigned to Ayr in the Pro draft for the Scottish Premiership sides from Glasgow Warriors for the 2017-18 season.

Professional career
On 11 December 2015, Hughes was loaned out to London Scottish to get game time before the Six Nations tournament. Hughes scored five tries in four appearances for Scottish before returning to Glasgow Warriors in time for the Ospreys game on 31 January 2016.

Hughes scored his first competitive try for Glasgow Warriors in the match against the Ospreys.

He made his debut for the Ayrshire Bulls in the Super 6 on 16 November 2019. He scored 2 tries.

On 2 January 2020 Hughes went on loan to Leicester Tigers.

International career
Hughes was selected as part of Scotland head coach Vern Cotter's 2015 Rugby Union World Cup training squad of 46 players.

He made his international début for Scotland against Italy in Turin, Italy on 22 August 2015.

References

External links
 Rory Hughes Scotland 7s profile
 Rory Hughes in Scotland World Cup training squad

1993 births
Living people
People educated at Kings Park Secondary School
Scottish rugby union players
Glasgow Warriors players
Scotland international rugby union players
Glasgow Hutchesons Aloysians RFC players
London Scottish F.C. players
Scotland international rugby sevens players
Ayr RFC players
Stirling County RFC players
Male rugby sevens players
Leicester Tigers players
Rugby union players from Glasgow